Pankaj Ramanbhai Patel (born 1952/1953) is an Indian billionaire businessman, and the chairman of Zydus Lifesciences, the fifth largest pharmaceutical company in India.

Early life
Pankaj Patel is a Gujarati. Patel holds Bachelor of Pharmacy and Master of Pharmacy degrees from Gujarat University, as well as a Bachelor of Arts in Science and Law from the University of Mumbai. After graduating, he joined Cadila Healthcare, which was founded by his father in 1952 to make vitamins.

Career
In 2017, he became the president of FICCI. He is the chairman of the board of governors of the Indian Institute of Science Education and Research, Kolkata and Indian Institute of Technology, Bhubaneswar; a member of the board of governors and also the chairman of the finance committee of the Indian Institute of Management, Ahmedabad; chairman of IIM Udaipur; member of the governing board of The Ahmedabad University, chairman of School of Life Sciences, Ahmedabad University; member of the board of management of the Narsee Monjee Institute of Management Studies and executive chairman, vice president and trustee of the Gujarat Cancer Society and chairman of the Gujarat Cancer and Research Institute.

Patel was named the "Best Pharma Man of the year 2003" by the Foundation of Indian Industry and Economists in recognition of the growth of Cadila under his leadership. At that time, Patel predicted that Zydus Cadila would become the third-largest pharmaceutical company in India by 2005. However, the company's fortunes were reversed and Patel fell out of the list of richest Indians by 2005.

He is the chairman of Zydus Hospitals, a large chain of hospitals in Gujarat.

Personal life
He is married to Priti Patel, a daughter of Dr B D Patel. They have two children. Their son Dr Sharvil Patel is managing director of Cadila Healthcare Ltd, and is married to Meha. Their daughter Shivani is married to Pranav D Patel, son of Dushyant D Patel.

In August 2012, Patel, along with Dinesh Patel, the chairman of Sintex Industries, purchased a Challenger-604 jet.

References

1950s births
Businesspeople in the pharmaceutical industry
Indian billionaires
Living people
Businesspeople from Ahmedabad
Gujarati people